Football Club Yertsakhu Ochamchira is a football club in the city of Ochamchire, in the state of Abkhazia that competes in the Abkhazian Premier League.

History
Founded on 1993 in the city of Ochamchire in the state of Abkhazia, the club is affiliated with the Football Federation of Abkhazia.

Titles
  Abkhazian Premier League (2)  
 Abkhazian Cup (2)  
 Abkhazia Super Cup (1)

Players 2020

References 

Association football clubs established in 1993